Worthington's White Shield (5.6% ABV) is an India pale ale (IPA) available principally in bottle conditioned form.

White Shield was first brewed by the Worthington Brewery in Burton upon Trent in 1829, primarily for export to the British Empire. Worthington merged with local rival Bass in 1927, which was itself taken over by Coors in 2002.

White Shield has won the CAMRA Champion Bottled Beer of Britain Gold award three times, more than any other beer.

Production 

White Shield is principally available as a bottle conditioned beer, although it has periodically been made available in cask-conditioned form.

White Shield is brewed using pale malt and a small amount of crystal malt. The hops used are Challenger, Fuggles and Northdown. Different yeasts are used for primary and secondary fermentation. After primary fermentation, the beer is conditioned in bulk for three weeks. Once packaged, it is matured in the bottle for a month before being sent out for distribution. Molson Coors claim that the beer will continue to mature in the bottle for up to three years. Former brewer Steve Wellington described the product in 2011 as "pretty much unchanged since appearing first in 1829".

History 

Worthington launched East India Pale Ale, their first IPA, in 1829. It was exported to British expatriates across the Empire, mostly officers and civil servants, as the soldiers tended to drink porter, which was more affordable. The growth of the railway network allowed for increased distribution of the beer throughout the United Kingdom. The beer was brewed using the Burton Union system.

The White Shield logo was introduced from the 1870s, and by the end of the nineteenth century the beer took on this name with drinkers. Worthington officially renamed their India Pale Ale White Shield from 1950.

92,000 barrels of White Shield were brewed in 1952–53. Bass announced that White Shield would be discontinued in 1961: it was unpopular with many publicans as it had to be stored at a certain temperature and could not be served chilled. Bass ultimately reversed their decision, but just 15,000 barrels were brewed in 1965. Bass lowered the alcohol content of the beer in 1967.

White Shield found renewed popularity in the early 1970s as the demand for real ale grew, but lost this position as the availability of cask ale improved.

Bass relocated production from Burton to their Hope & Anchor brewery in Sheffield in 1981, and the beer ceased to be brewed using the Burton Union method. Production in 1988 totalled 12,000 barrels. The Hope & Anchor brewery was closed down in 1992, and production was moved to Cape Hill in Birmingham, before production was contracted to King and Barnes of Sussex in 1998. By this time, production was down to just 1,000 barrels a year, and the beer's long-term survival was in doubt. The King and Barnes brewery closed down in 2000, and production moved to the Bass owned White Shield microbrewery in Burton upon Trent.

In 2000, a total of 500 barrels were produced. In 2010, production was moved to the newly constructed William Worthington's Brewery, a microbrewery based at the National Brewery Centre in Burton. In 2012, increasing demand saw White Shield production moved to the main Coors brewery in Burton.

Roger Protz reported that White Shield was the highest selling bottle-conditioned beer in Britain in 2013. However, in 2018 he suggested that distribution of the beer had declined.

References 

Beer brands of the United Kingdom
1829 introductions
Molson Coors brands